Star Club and Bedford Star are rowing clubs on the River Great Ouse, based at Poynter's Boathouse, Batt's Ford, Commercial Road, Bedford, Bedfordshire. The two clubs usually race as a composite crew.

History
The club was founded in 1960 by former members of RAF Cardington Rowing Club. The boathouse was originally 100 metres upstream from the current site.

The club won the Jackson Trophy in 1962 at the Head of the River Race and has won the trophy in total six times. In 1972 the club merged with the Bedford Ladies Rowing Club. The club won the prestigious Grand Challenge Cup at the Henley Regatta with the Leander Club in 1991.

Club colours
The blade colours are white with a red star (Star Club)/just white (Bedford Star).

Notable members
 Tim Foster
 Miriam Taylor

Honours

Henley Royal Regatta

British champions

References

Sport in Bedfordshire
Sport in Bedford
Rowing clubs in England
Rowing clubs of the River Great Ouse
Bedford